Fieberiella is a genus of leafhoppers in the family Cicadellidae. There are at least 20 described species in Fieberiella.

Species
These 23 species belong to the genus Fieberiella:

 Fieberiella anategea Meyer-Arndt 1991 c g
 Fieberiella aschei Meyer-Arndt 1988 c g
 Fieberiella bohemica Dlabola 1965 c g
 Fieberiella chioscola Meyer-Arndt 1988 c g
 Fieberiella drosopouli Meyer-Arndt 1988 c g
 Fieberiella duffelsi Wagner 1963 c g
 Fieberiella florii (Stal, 1864) c g b (privet leafhopper)
 Fieberiella gemelina Dlabola 1965 c g
 Fieberiella hyrcana Dlabola 1984 c g
 Fieberiella ida Dlabola 1965 c g
 Fieberiella knighti Dlabola 1965 c g
 Fieberiella kritiella Dlabola 1989 c g
 Fieberiella leridana Dlabola 1985 c g
 Fieberiella lindbergi Wagner 1963 c g
 Fieberiella lugubris Emeljanov, 1964 g
 Fieberiella macchiae Linnavuori 1962 c g
 Fieberiella malickana Dlabola 1994 c g
 Fieberiella oenderi Dlabola 1985 c g
 Fieberiella pallida Melichar 1896 c g
 Fieberiella peloponnissi Meyer-Arndt 1988 c g
 Fieberiella pulcherrima Berg 1879 c g
 Fieberiella salacia Dlabola 1965 c g
 Fieberiella septentrionalis W.Wagner, 1963 g

Data sources: i = ITIS, c = Catalogue of Life, g = GBIF, b = Bugguide.net

References

Further reading

External links

 

Cicadellidae genera
Fieberiellini